Orlando Silva Infante (born 29 April 1929) is a Chilean basketball player. He competed in the men's tournament at the 1952 Summer Olympics and the 1956 Summer Olympics.

References

External links
 

1929 births
Possibly living people
Chilean men's basketball players
1959 FIBA World Championship players
Olympic basketball players of Chile
Basketball players at the 1952 Summer Olympics
Basketball players at the 1956 Summer Olympics
Sportspeople from Santiago